A.K.A. Birdseye is a Swiss 2002 crime comedy film directed by Stephen Beckner and Michael C. Huber and starring Fred Ward.

Background 

The film is a mockumentary and was shot in Zürich, Los Angeles and Colorado. Ward's scenes were shot in Colorado, but with special effects added to the location in Zürich.

Before its official release the film premiered at the Locarno Film Festival on August 7, 2002.

Cast
 Fred Ward as Nolan Sharpless
 Stefan Kurt as "Birdseye" / Urs Vogelsaug / Rolf Meili
 Frederick Koehler as Ben Sharpless
 Johnny Whitworth as Trent Doone
 Amy Hathaway as Heidi Logan
 Jaimz Woolvett as "Fingers"
 Beth Grant as Ruth Betters
 Michael Horse as Pete Longshadow
 Kevin Quinn as Marty
 R. Lee Ermey as Sheriff Gathers
 Lisa Blount as Vicky Sharpless
 Pato Hoffmann as Alvin Karpis
 Iqbal Theba as Puneet Ristani
 Other actors including Hanspeter Müller, Stephanie Glaser, Mike Müller, Brian Howe, Brigitte Beyeler, Patti Allison and Jeanne Zelasko.

External links 
 Birdseye on Vimeo Complete movie
 

2002 films
English-language Swiss films
2000s crime comedy films
Films set in the United States
2002 comedy films
2000s English-language films